Gordon Rupert Dickson (November 1, 1923 – January 31, 2001) was a Canadian-American science fiction writer. He was inducted into the Science Fiction and Fantasy Hall of Fame in 2000.

Biography 
Dickson was born in Edmonton, Alberta, in 1923. After the death of his father, he moved with his mother to Minneapolis in 1937. He served in the United States Army, from 1943 to 1946, and received a Bachelor of Arts from the University of Minnesota, in 1948. From 1948 through 1950 he attended the University of Minnesota for graduate work. His first published speculative fiction was the short story "Trespass!", written jointly with Poul Anderson, in the Spring 1950 issue of Fantastic Stories Quarterly (ed. Sam Merwin), the inaugural number of Fantastic Story Magazine as it came to be titled. Next year three of his solo efforts were published by John W. Campbell in Astounding Science Fiction and one appeared in Planet Stories. Anderson and Dickson also inaugurated the Hoka series with "The Sheriff of Canyon Gulch" (Other Worlds Science Stories, May 1951).

Dickson's series of novels include the Childe Cycle (sometimes called the Dorsai series) and the Dragon Knight. He won three Hugo Awards and one Nebula Award.

For a great part of his life, he suffered from the effects of asthma. He died of complications from severe asthma.

Personality 
John Clute has characterized Dickson as a "gregarious, engaging, genial, successful man of letters" who had not been an introvert. Clute considers Dickson a science fiction romantic.  Nevertheless, Clute stresses in connection to Dickson that science fiction welcomes "images of heightened solitude, romantically vague, limitless landscapes, and an anguished submission to afflatus", due to its origin in Gothic fiction.

Style 
Clute has pointed out that Dickson, like Poul Anderson, with whom he collaborated in the Hoka series, "[tends] to infuse an austere Nordic pathos into wooded, rural midwestern American settings.' His works often have mercenaries as their protagonists and deal with aliens that are "less deracinated and more lovable than humans" (Clute). They "are inclined to take on a heightened, sagalike complexion" (Clute), particularly by the insertion of lyric poetry that is sometimes inferior.

Selected works

Childe Cycle

 Dorsai! (1959) (variant title: The Genetic General)
 Necromancer (1962) (variant title: No Room for Man)
 Soldier, Ask Not (1967)
 Tactics of Mistake (1971)
 The Spirit of Dorsai (1979)
 Lost Dorsai (1980)
 The Final Encyclopedia (1984)
 The Dorsai Companion (1986)
 The Chantry Guild (1988)
 Young Bleys (1991)
 Other (1994)
 Antagonist (with David W. Wixon) (2007)

Dragon Knight series

 The Dragon and the George (1976)
 The Dragon Knight (1990)
 The Dragon on the Border (1992)
 The Dragon at War (1992)
 The Dragon, the Earl, and the Troll (1994)
 The Dragon and the Djinn (1996)
 The Dragon and the Gnarly King (1997)
 The Dragon in Lyonesse (1998)
 The Dragon and the Fair Maid of Kent (2000)

Hoka series
 Earthman's Burden (1957) (with Poul Anderson) (contents different under variant title: Hoka! Hoka! Hoka!) (1998) —collection of stories published 1951 to 1956
 Hoka! (1983) (with Poul Anderson)
 Star Prince Charlie (1983) (with Poul Anderson)
 Hokas Pokas! (2000) (with Poul Anderson) (includes Star Prince Charlie)

Novels
 Alien from Arcturus (1956) (expanded as Arcturus Landing)
 Mankind on the Run (1956) (variant title: On the Run, 1979)
 Time to Teleport (1960)
 Naked to the Stars (1961)
 Spacial Delivery (1961)
 Delusion World (1961)
 The Alien Way (1965)
 Space Winners (1965)
 Mission to Universe (1965) (rev. 1977)
 The Space Swimmers (1967)
 Planet Run (1967) (with Keith Laumer)
 Spacepaw (1969)
 Wolfling (1969)
 None But Man (1969)
 Hour of the Horde (1970)
 Sleepwalkers’ World (1971)
 The Outposter (1972)
 The Pritcher Mass (1972)
 Alien Art (1973)
 The R-Master (1973) (revised as The Last Master, 1984)
 Gremlins, Go Home (1974) (with Ben Bova)
  The Lifeship (variant title: Lifeboat) (1977) (with Harry Harrison)
 Time Storm (1977)
 The Far Call (1978)
 Home from the Shore (1978)
 Pro (1978) (illustrated by James R. Odbert) (Ace Illustrated Novel)
 Masters of Everon (1980)
 The Last Master (1984)
 Jamie the Red (1984) (with Roland Green)
 The Forever Man (1986)
 Way of the Pilgrim (1987)
 The Earth Lords (1989)
 Wolf and Iron (1990)
 The Magnificent Wilf (1995)
 The Right to Arm Bears (2000) omnibus of Spacial Delivery, Spacepaw, "The Law-Twister Shorty"

Short story collections

 Danger—Human (1970) (as The Book of Gordon Dickson, 1973)
 Mutants (1970)
 The Star Road (1973)
 Ancient, My Enemy (1974)
 Gordon R. Dickson's SF Best (1978) (revised as In the Bone, 1987)
 In Iron Years (1980)
 Love Not Human (1981)
 The Man from Earth (1983)
 Dickson! (1984) (revised as Steel Brother {1985})
 Survival! (1984)
 Forward! (1985)
 Beyond the Dar Al-Harb (1985)
 Invaders! (1985)
 Steel Brother (1985)
 The Man the Worlds Rejected (1986)
 Mindspan (1986)
 The Last Dream (1986)
 The Stranger (1987)
 Guided Tour (1988)
 Beginnings (1988)
 Ends (1988)
 The Human Edge (2003)

Children's books
 Secret under the Sea (1960)
 Secret under Antarctica (1963)
 Secret under the Caribbean (1964)
 Secrets of the Deep (1985) omnibus of the three above

Awards

Dickson received the 1977 Skylark —Edward E. Smith Memorial Award for Imaginative Fiction from NESFA— for his contribution to SF and he was inducted by the Science Fiction and Fantasy Hall of Fame in 2000.

He won several annual literary awards for particular works.
Hugo Award
 "Soldier, Ask Not" for best short story, 1965
 "Lost Dorsai" for best novella, 1981
 "The Cloak and the Staff" for best novelette, 1981
Nebula Award
 "Call Him Lord" for best novelette, 1966
August Derleth Award (best novel, British Fantasy Society)
 The Dragon and the George, 1977

References
 
Citations

External links

 
 
 
 
 Bibliography at SciFan
 Gordon R. Dickson's online fiction at Free Speculative Fiction Online''
 
 Interview by Kay Drache of Hennepin County Library, Northern Lights Minnesota Author Interview TV Series #175 (1991)

 
1923 births
2001 deaths
University of Minnesota alumni
20th-century American novelists
American male novelists
American fantasy writers
United States Army personnel of World War II
American science fiction writers
American short story writers
Canadian emigrants to the United States
Canadian expatriate writers in the United States
Filkers
Hugo Award-winning writers
Nebula Award winners
Writers from Edmonton
Writers from Minneapolis
Science Fiction Hall of Fame inductees
American male short story writers
Novelists from Minnesota
20th-century American male writers